Mark Anderson may refer to:

In sport
Mark Anderson (American football) (born 1983), American football player 
Mark Anderson (decathlete) (born 1958), American decathlete and competitor at the 1983 World Championships
Mark Anderson (distance runner), American distance runner and medallist at the 1980 IAAF World Cross Country Championships
Mark Anderson (footballer, born 1989), English soccer player for Spennymoor Town FC
Mark Anderson (golfer) (born 1986), American professional golfer
Mark Anderson (South African soccer) (born 1962), South African soccer player
Mark Anderson (sprinter) (born 1991), Belizean sprinter
Mark Anderson (swimmer) (born 1952), Australian swimmer

In other fields
Mark Anderson (Arizona politician) (born 1957), Arizona politician
Mark Anderson (Minnesota politician) (born 1958), Minnesota politician
Mark Anderson (Connecticut politician), member of the Connecticut House of Representatives
Mark Anderson (Royal Navy officer), British admiral
Mark Anderson (pianist), American pianist and prize winner in the 1993 Leeds International Piano Competition
Mark Anderson (writer) (born 1967), American journalist and proponent of the Oxfordian theory of Shakespeare
Mark E. Anderson, U.S. National Guard general

See also
Mark Andersen, punk rock activist and author who lives in Washington D.C.
Marc Anderson (disambiguation)